This article details the characters found in all four versions of The Tick.

Main characters

The Tick

The Tick is a superhero in a blue bug suit (which may or may not be part of his body). He is the main protagonist of the Tick franchise.

Arthur
Arthur is the Tick's sidekick. He is formally introduced in The Tick #4, but appears as a mysterious flying figure in the background of earlier issues of that series. Trained as an accountant, Arthur purchased his moth suit at an auction, and decided to pursue the life of a superhero (resulting in indefinite "psychiatric leave" from his accounting firm). After rescuing a powerful ninja artifact (the Thorn of Oblivion) and helping the Tick and Oedipus defeat the ninjas, Arthur decides to become the Tick's sidekick. As a running joke, Arthur is often mistaken for a bunny (owing to the shape and size of his costume's antennae, and the fact that his wings are usually folded up). His doughy physique, shy manner, lack of self-confidence, and hesitation in the face of danger is often played for comic contrast against the attitudes and tendencies of the other characters (especially the Tick himself). Arthur is ethnically Jewish (mentioned in an episode of the 1994 cartoon series), and his family would strongly prefer he leave the superhero lifestyle and return to accounting. Arthur's apartment serves as his and the Tick's superhero headquarters. The 2016 TV series reveals Arthur's full name to be "Arthur Everest", but it is unknown if this is his full name in any other media.

In the 1994 cartoon series, Arthur is voiced by Micky Dolenz in Season One and by Rob Paulsen in Seasons Two and Three. In the 2001 TV series, Arthur is portrayed by David Burke. In the 2016 TV series, Arthur is portrayed by Griffin Newman.

Main allies of the Tick
The Tick has different main allies in each of his media appearances:

 American Maid (voiced by Kay Lenz) – A parody of Wonder Woman and Captain America exclusive to the 1994 series, American Maid is the World's Most Patriotic Domestic and has a love/hate relationship with Die Fledermaus, though there are hints at a past romance. She is possibly the only competent superhero in the animated series apart from the Tick and Arthur, with whom she occasionally teams up. American Maid is a skilled acrobat and can throw her tiara and stilettos with extreme accuracy. Her name is a pun on "American made".
 Batmanuel (portrayed by Nestor Carbonell) – Exclusive to the 2001 TV series, Batmanuel is a Latino parody of Batman who teams up with the Tick and Arthur. Although he claims to be a superhero, Batmanuel doesn't have any special powers and is shown to be a cowardly, shady, and lecherous superhero. He has a love/hate relationship with Captain Liberty.
 Captain Liberty (portrayed by Liz Vassey) – Exclusive to the 2001 TV series, Captain Liberty is a parody of Wonder Woman who teams up with the Tick and Arthur. She is a serious and somewhat sarcastic superhero who works for the CIA. Despite acting tough to other people, she occasionally has relationship issues and woman problems. She has a love/hate relationship with Batmanuel.
 Die Fledermaus (voiced by Cam Clarke) – Exclusive to the 1994 TV series, Die Fledermaus has a love/hate relationship with American Maid, though there are hints at a past romance. Die Fledermaus is usually the first superhero to run away from danger except on specific occasions. He is also egotistical and obsessed with beautiful women. Die Fledermaus' equipment consists of a roof swinging grappling line gun, utility belt and exoskeleton, and articulated cape. Die Fledermaus means "the bat" in German, literally "the flitter-mouse". Another parody of Batman.
 Sewer Urchin (voiced by Jess Harnell) – A sea urchin-themed superhero who has a luxurious apartment, largely furnished with salvage from the sewers. However, he has relatively few guests. Sewer Urchin has super stench slime secreting spikes on his suit that enable him to stick on any surface. He is also equipped with lemon grenades, butter shooters, bars of soap, and other various apparel to aid him in his underground endeavor. In addition, he has an oxygen tank and mask which allow him to breathe in the thickest of sewer sludge.
Overkill/Straight Shooter (portrayed by Scott Speiser) - Exclusive to the 2016 TV series he is an antihero vigilante who is seeking to find the Terror. Initially out to retrieve Arthur's stolen suit from him, Overkill becomes aware of Arthur's theory that the Terror is still alive and reluctantly joins forces with him and the Tick. Operator of "Danger-Boat" and teacher/romantic interest to Arthur's sister Dot, Overkill used to be Uncle Samson's sidekick Straight Shooter until the day when Terror massacred the Flag Five where the syphilis rendered him blind and the Terror's minions crushed his hands. This caused Overkill to gain cybernetic eyes and hands to replace his lost body parts. Above average strength, speed, agility, and healing. He wields a sniper rifle, dual knives, handgun, shuriken, and bombs. He is a direct parody of Deathstroke.

Characters in the comic book

Superheroes
Superheroes in The Tick include:

Super-villains
Supervillains in The Tick include:

Characters in the animated series

Superheroes

Sidekicks

Supervillains

Henchmen

Civilians

In the 1994 TV series, there are different civilians that live in The City:

Characters in the 2001 live-action series

Superheroes

Supervillains

Characters in the 2016 live-action series

Superheroes

Supervillains

Civilians
In the 2016 TV series, there are different civilians that live in The City:

References

Characters
American comics characters
Lists of comics characters
Lists of minor fictional characters